The Bolivia national baseball team is the national baseball team of Bolivia. The team represents Bolivia in international competitions.

References

National baseball teams
Baseball